Kentucky Route 1632 (KY 1632) is a  state highway in Campbell County, Kentucky. It connects KY 9 in Wilder with US 27 and KY 8 in Southgate, Kentucky, just south of the border with Fort Thomas, near Exit 2 of I-471. It is considered a secondary road and is signed Moock Road for its entire length.

Route description
KY 1632 begins at an intersection with KY 9 in Wilder, heading east on two-lane undivided Moock Road. The road heads through wooded areas with some residential development, curving to the northeast. The route turns to the east again before heading northeast again. KY 1632 comes to its eastern terminus at an intersection with US 27 in Southgate just northwest of an interchange with I-471.

Major intersections

References

External links
 

1632
1632